Gopura Deepam is a 1997 Indian Tamil-language film written and directed by Ramarajan. The film stars Ramarajan, Sukanya, R. Sundarrajan and Senthil.

Cast 

Ramarajan
Sukanya
R. Sundarrajan
Senthil
Pandu
Madhan Bob
Balu Anand
Kovai Sarala
R. S. Shivaji
Halwa Vasu
Oru Viral Krishna Rao
Kullamani
Theni Kunjarammal
Karikalan
Varalakshmi
Thiruppur Ramasamy
Vittal Prasath
Samikannu
T. S. Ragavendhar
Arjunan
Vellai Subbaiah
Somanathan
Nikila
Vijayasanthi
Arunadevi

Soundtrack 
The music was composed by Soundaryan.

References

External links 
 

1997 films
1990s Tamil-language films
Films directed by Ramarajan